The Baydar Gate (elevation ) is a mountain pass in the Crimean Mountains connecting the Baidar Valley with the Black Sea coast. It is enclosed by Mount Chelebi (657 m) and Mount Ckhu-Bair (705 m). The old Yalta-Sevastopol highway, dating from the 1830s and seldom used today, passes through here. When the highway was completed in 1848, the so-called Propylaea were built of local limestone to commemorate the event. This Neoclassical gate offers scenic views, including that of the picturesque Foros Church set atop a 400-metre cliff overlooking the sea coast.

See also 
 Laspi Pass - a neighbouring mountain pass, the one normally used today

External links 
 

Mountain passes of Ukraine
Landforms of Crimea
Mountain passes of Russia